Erik Albert Holmgren (7 July 1872 – 18 March 1943) was a Swedish mathematician  known for contributions to partial differential equations. Holmgren's uniqueness theorem is named after him. Torsten Carleman was one of his students. His father was the mathematician Hjalmar Holmgren (1822 – 1885).

Notes

External links

Swedish mathematicians
PDE theorists
1943 deaths
1872 births